Fred J. Mann (April 1, 1858 – April 6, 1916) was an American center fielder in Major League Baseball for six seasons, and played for five different teams.  

He was born in Sutton, Vermont and debuted with the Worcester Ruby Legs in 1882. In 1884, Mann's seven home runs was tied for fourth in the American Association.

After his baseball career was over, Mann ran a hotel in Springfield, Massachusetts. He died of prostate cancer and is interred at Oak Grove Cemetery in Springfield.

References

External links

Major League Baseball center fielders
Worcester Ruby Legs players
Philadelphia Athletics (AA) players
Columbus Buckeyes players
Pittsburgh Alleghenys players
Cleveland Blues (1887–88) players
Baseball players from Vermont
1858 births
1916 deaths
Columbus Senators players
Charleston Seagulls players
Hartford (minor league baseball) players
19th-century baseball players
burials in Massachusetts